Granville Harcourt-Vernon may refer to:

Granville Harcourt-Vernon (1792–1879), MP 
Granville Harcourt-Vernon (1816–1861), MP, son of the above